Sitges is a Rodalies de Catalunya railway station serving Sitges, in Catalonia, Spain.

The station has three platforms: platform 1 is the location of the main ticket office and waiting room as well as the entrance and exit to the station. Platforms 2 and 3 form an island platform which are accessed by an underground subway from platform 1.

Coming from Barcelona the preceding station is Garraf and the following station is Vilanova i la Geltrú.

References

External links
 Sitges listing at Rodalies de Catalunya website
 Information and photos of the station at trenscat.cat 

Railway stations in Catalonia
Railway stations in Spain opened in 1881
Rodalies de Catalunya stations
Sitges
Transport in Garraf